Theoretically Pure Anterograde Amnesia is the fourth studio album by the Caretaker, an alias of musician Leyland Kirby. Released in 2005, it abandoned the haunted ballroom aesthetic of the previous albums and explored memory loss. Divided into six CDs, it consists of seventy-two drone tracks combined to create a five-hour long release. It was compared by several critics to other musicians, including Merzbow, Boards of Canada, and Krzysztof Penderecki.

The liner notes for Theoretically Pure Anterograde Amnesia were written by Mark Fisher. The blogger, who referenced the record on his book Ghosts of My Life (2014), committed suicide in 2017, for which Kirby created Take Care. It's a Desert Out There.... Theoretically Pure Anterograde Amnesia was met with general praise from music critics, who felt it improved on the Caretaker's style. However, some of the tracks were criticized for their production. The album has since been considered a precursor to the Caretaker's final and most acclaimed project, Everywhere at the End of Time.

Background
The Caretaker was an alias of English musician Leyland Kirby that explored the haunted ballroom scene of the horror film The Shining. His first three albums are called the "haunted ballroom trilogy", spanning Selected Memories from the Haunted Ballroom (1999), A Stairway to the Stars (2001), and We'll All Go Riding on a Rainbow. According to Kirby, the Caretaker alias found a "big leap" with Theoretically Pure Anterograde Amnesia, as it explored memory loss. The album marks a conceptual change for the Caretaker alias, as its themes of memory loss made the pseudonym much more complex than previous releases did.

Composition and style
Theoretically Pure Anterograde Amnesia explores drone, experimental, plunderphonics, dark ambient, hauntology, and noise. Divided into six CDs, it consists of minimal drones made from orchestral music samples by Anglo-Italian orchestra conductor Mantovani slowed down and reverberated to an extreme amount. All of these samples come from a 6xLP box set known as "The Magic of Mantovani", with each track on the album corresponding to tracks on the box set. It has a basic concept and sound design, with its track titles simply being "Memories". In the album, Kirby uses various filtering and echo effects to reflect the disorientation felt by an amnesiac.

Production
Kirby's fascination with memory loss on the Caretaker's later albums started with Theoretically Pure Anterograde Amnesia. The musician said the CDs attempted to recreate the experience of having the disorder within sound; Kirby said, "Even if you listen over and over to all the songs, you still can’t remember when these melodies will come in. You have no favourite tracks, it’s like a dream you are trying to remember." According to Kirby, Theoretically Pure Anterograde Amnesia is a release that did not follow his trend of "creating a mood." He stated he made the album with the intention of making it hard to remember, "an audio fog in many ways." Kirby said the album can be confusing because of the way the tracks are titled combined with them all being of a relatively similar length. With the record, Kirby explored a specific condition rather than what he said were "memories or echoes of something." Kirby never specified hauntology as his goal but did call his music hauntological.

Release

Theoretically Pure Anterograde Amnesia was first released in December 2005 as a free download on Kirby's website for the V/Vm Test record label. It was later released in physical form with no track titles on 31 May 2006, featuring liner notes written by blogger Mark Fisher. The record's liner notes, as well as the album title, were later mentioned by him on his book Ghosts of My Life, released in 2014. After Fisher's suicide in 2017 with severe depression, Kirby released Take Care. It's a Desert Out There... in tribute of the writer and his descriptions of the Caretaker's music. According to the writer, Theoretically Pure Anterograde Amnesia had been "designed to be forgotten". Kirby later released several outtakes of the album on Additional Amnesiac Memories (2006) and another shorter album of similar style titled Deleted Scenes, Forgotten Dreams.

Critical reception

Theoretically Pure Anterograde Amnesia received praise from music critics, who felt it improved the Caretaker's style. Writing for Grooves, Allan Harrison said it "is quite a trip", calling it one of the year's most ambitious albums, and one of the Caretaker's darkest releases. Scott McKeating of Stylus Magazine felt the record "needs to be checked out." However, he criticized some of the tracks, specifically "Memory Fifty", where it "sounds like The Caretaker just turned the whole thing backwards and pressed play." Brainwashed's Matthew Jeanes summarized his review with the statement that, if Kirby's six discs exploring amnesia are not "enough murky drone for a lifetime, I don't know what is." According to Kirby, the album was downloaded over 50,000 times and put him "back on the critical radar." It is the first Caretaker release to be presented as a "recommended disc" on Italian music magazine OndaRock.

Track listing
Adapted from Bandcamp.

References

External links
  on Bandcamp
 
 
 

2005 albums
The Caretaker (musician) albums
Amnesia